Keianna Albury (born 28 July 1996) is a Bahamian sprinter from Eleuthera Bahamas who attended St. Augustine's College in Nassau, Bahamas before going on to compete for Pennsylvania State University.

References

External links
 World Athletics Bio
 Penn State Bio

Bahamian female sprinters
1996 births
People from Eleuthera
Sportspeople from Nassau, Bahamas
Pennsylvania State University alumni
Living people
Penn State Nittany Lions women's track and field athletes